Tarun Weeramanthri (Ph.D.) is an Australian public health doctor and adjunct professor at the University of Western Australia (UWA). He was the Chief Health Officer of the Northern Territory from 2004 to 2007, and Western Australia from 2008 to 2018.

Career
Weeramanthri has a Ph.D. in social medicine from the University of Sydney.

Weeramanthri was Chief Health Officer of the Northern Territory between 2004 and 2007, succeeding Shirley Hendy, and succeeded by Barbara Paterson.

Weeramanthri began as Chief Health Officer of Western Australia in 2008. Achievements in public health in Western Australia under his leadership include the Public Health Act 2016, replacing the Health Act 1911, and the opening of Perth Children's Hospital after lead and asbestos issues. During part of this time, he was also Assistant Director General of the Department of Health. In May 2018, he went on leave, formally resigning on 20 October 2018. He was succeeded by Andrew Robertson.

Weeramanthri is an Adjunct Professor for the UWA School of Population and Global Health, and deputy chair of the Pathwest board.

During Victoria's second wave of COVID-19 in mid-2020, Weeramanthri assisted with the state's public health response and relieved for Victoria's Chief Health Officer Brett Sutton. He was also a special advisor to the Western Australian government for its COVID-19 response during 2020.

In October 2020, Weeramanthri was appointed president of the Public Health Association of Australia.

In February 2021, Weeramanthri was appointed by the Western Australian government to conduct a review into the procedures and processes of the state's hotel quarantine program, after a security guard working at a quarantine hotel caught COVID-19 from a guest, causing parts of Western Australia to go into a 5-day lockdown.

Awards and honours
Public Health Association of Australia's President's Award (2013)
Sidney Sax Medal for contribution to public health in Australia (2014)
Western Australia Minister for Health's award for Outstanding Commitment to a Healthier Western Australia (2018)

References

Living people
Year of birth missing (living people)
21st-century Australian medical doctors
21st-century Australian public servants
Australian health officials
University of Sydney alumni
University of Western Australia alumni
Academic staff of the University of Western Australia